Bertha Townsend defended her tennis singles title by defeating Lida Voorhees 7–5, 6–2 in the Challenge Round of the 1889 U.S. Women's National Singles Championship. Voorhuis had won the right to challenge Townsend by defeating Helen Day Harris 6–5, 2–6, 6–3 in the final of the All Comers' competition. The event was held at the Philadelphia Cricket Club, Pennsylvania.

Draw

Challenge round

All Comers' finals

References

1889
1889 in American women's sports
Women's Singles
1889 in women's tennis
Women's sports in Pennsylvania
1889 in Pennsylvania